The Red Checkers was the aerobatic/precision flying Team of the Royal New Zealand Air Force. The Checkers fly the Pacific Aerospace CT-4E Airtrainer. Previous aircraft used were the CT4B and North American Harvard (T-6).  Until the year 1994 the Checkers were based at Wigram. Aircraft used by the team had a nose painted in a red and white checkered pattern, but this has now been reduced to a small checkered stripe.

In 1973 the team was disbanded due to a world fuel crisis but was formed again in 1980.

Incidents 
Squadron Leader Nick Cree was killed when the CT-4 training aircraft he was flying hit the ground while practicing aerial display manoeuvres near RNZAF Base Ohakea on 14 January 2010.

On 1 March 2010 two aircraft touched during training with one aircraft incurring minor damage. The Red Checkers were grounded for the rest of the season.

Disbandment 

The Red Checkers display team was disbanded following the arrival of the Beechcraft T-6 Texan II and retirement of the CT-4 Airtrainer. They were replaced by the Black Falcons, who fly the Beechcraft T-6 Texan II.

References

External links

 Central Flying School at the RNZAF website

Units and formations of the Royal New Zealand Air Force
Aerobatic teams